Jayne West is an American operatic soprano, who was born in White Plains, New York, and was raised in Framingham, Massachusetts.  After graduation from Oberlin College, she moved to Boston, where she studied at the Boston Conservatory.

West has appeared with the Austin Lyric Opera (Pamina in Die Zauberflöte), Berkshire Opera Company (Donna Elvira in Don Giovanni, and Anne Trulove in The Rake's Progress), Boston Baroque (Acis and Galatea), Boston Landmarks Orchestra (Beethoven's Ninth Symphony), Houston Grand Opera, Nashville Opera, Opera Festival of New Jersey, Opera/Omaha (world premiere of Weisgall's The Gardens of Adonis), Opera Quotannis, and Théâtre Royal de la Monnaie.  She was also in the 1985 world-premiere of the Glass/Moran The Juniper Tree.

West also sang in the Mark Morris Dance Group's productions of L'allegro, il penseroso ed il moderato, Dido and Æneas, and Four Saints in Three Acts.  The soprano has been heard with the orchestras of Baltimore, Boston, Buffalo, Detroit, Pensacola, Philadelphia, Seattle, Utah and Washington DC; and has sung at the festivals of Bethlehem Bach, Saito Kinen, San Antonio and Tanglewood.

She portrayed Contessa Almaviva in Peter Sellars' production of Le nozze di Figaro, which was seen in Barcelona, Boston, New York, Paris and Vienna.  It was made into a film (1989), as well.  West also sings in Robert Craft's important recording of The Rake's Progress (with Jon Garrison, 1993).  She can be heard in two excerpts from Handel's Hercules (1999), on the recording entitled "Lorraine at Emmanuel," opposite Lorraine Hunt Lieberson, which was published in 2008, and is a soloist in Craig Smith's recording of Bach's "St John Passion" (with Frank Kelley as the Evangelist, 1999).  In 2009, a "live" recording of the premiere of The Juniper Tree was released on Compact Disc.

The soprano also sang cameo roles in two historic recordings, the original version of Cherubini's Médée (as A Lady of Dircé, 1987) and Gluck's Iphigénie en Tauride (as the Second Priestess and the goddess Diane, 1999).

In 2009, West appeared with the Boston Secession in the world-premiere performance of Ruth Lomon's Testimony of Witnesses, a concert-length oratorio based on the poetry and writings of survivors and victims of the Holocaust, under the direction of Jane Ring Frank.  Earlier, she had recorded the same composer's "Songs of Remembrance," for CRI.

As of 2011, the soprano lives in Amesbury, Massachusetts, and is on the voice faculty at the Longy School of Music.

References 

 Liner notes for MusicMasters recording of The Rake's Progress, 1994.
 Stagebill, March 1997.
Boston Secession 2008/2009 Season

External links
 Official website

American operatic sopranos
Year of birth missing (living people)
Living people
Oberlin College alumni
Boston Conservatory at Berklee alumni
People from White Plains, New York
People from Framingham, Massachusetts
Singers from New York (state)
Singers from Massachusetts
Classical musicians from New York (state)
Classical musicians from Massachusetts
20th-century American women opera singers
21st-century American women opera singers
Longy School of Music of Bard College faculty
American women academics